Abdul Kadir Jamali (10 May 1944 – 12 March 2002, Karachi) was a Pakistani cricketer who played in four Tests from 1964 to 1965. A wicket-keeper, Abdul was run out for 95 on his Test debut, against Australia at Karachi. He had opened the batting with Khalid Ibadulla with whom he made 249, also this is the only 200+ stand by two debutants for any wicket in the history of test cricket. He was also the first sindhi speaking cricketer in Pakistan. He was the first Pakistani cricketer to be dismissed in the 90's on test debut. His only other Test half century was an innings of 58 at Auckland.

Abdul Kadir got his earlier education from Sindh Madrasatul Islam. He was the son of famous religious scholar Mufti Azam Pakistsan Moulana  Sahibdad Khan Jamali. Two of his brothers also played first-class cricket Abdul Aziz and Abdul Rasheed. Later, Abdul Kadir served as vice president in National Bank of Pakistan. He died on 12 March-2002.

Records
Abdul Kadir (95) on debut went on to be part of unbroken record (as of March 2013). The partnership of 249 between Ibadulla and Abdul Kadir (95) for Pakistan against Australia in Karachi in 1964–65 is the highest in Test cricket for any wicket to involve two test debutants.

References

1944 births
2002 deaths
Cricketers from Karachi
Pakistani cricketers
Pakistan Test cricketers
Karachi cricketers
Karachi A cricketers
Karachi Blues cricketers
Karachi Whites cricketers
National Bank of Pakistan cricketers
South Zone (Pakistan) cricketers
Sindh Madressatul Islam University alumni
Wicket-keepers